Ted Trenerry (24 February 1897 – 8 July 1983) was an Australian cricketer. He played five first-class matches for New South Wales between 1919/20 and 1920/21.

See also
 List of New South Wales representative cricketers

References

External links
 

1897 births
1983 deaths
Australian cricketers
New South Wales cricketers
People from Queanbeyan
Cricketers from New South Wales